Phonak was a Swiss professional cycling team from 2000 until 2006. The team was one of 20 teams in the first UCI ProTour in 2005. It won one race –  Santiago Botero's victory in the Tour de Romandie – and came second in the team ranking on the 2005 ProTour circuit.

History
A sponsor, iShares (subsidiary of Barclays Global Investors) signed a three-year contract in June 2006 to become the team's title sponsor from 2007. The team's name was to be iShares. Andy Rihs, owner of Phonak Hearing Systems, said on 15 August 2006 that the deal had been called off after the team's leader, Floyd Landis, tested positive for high levels of testosterone, and that the team would disband at the end of 2006.

During 2004 Phonak concentrated on supporting Tyler Hamilton in the Tour de France.  He crashed and withdrew and was later suspended for blood doping. Hamilton was not the last rider removed for doping, leading Phonak to stop sponsorship after 2006.

The riders accused of doping in 2004 were Hamilton, Santiago Pérez, Oscar Camenzind, Fabrizio Guidi (who was cleared) and Sascha Urweider.

On 5 August 2006 Phonak dismissed Floyd Landis after confirmation that a urine sample taken after his Stage 17 win twice tested positive for synthetic testosterone as well as a ratio of testosterone to epitestosterone nearly three times the limit allowed by World Anti-Doping Agency rules. His 2006 Tour de France win was erased from the books by the Union Cycliste Internationale on September 20, 2007.

Team rankings 
Phonak won the team classification at:
	
 2006 Giro d'Italia – Trofeo Fast Team and Trofeo Super Team (points)
 2006 Volta a Catalunya
 2006 Tour of Qatar
 2006 Paris–Nice 
 2006 Tour de Georgia

Final roster

Major wins 

2000
Berner Rundfahrt, Lukas Zumsteg
GP Winterthur, Pierre Bourquenoud
Vorarlberg GP, Matthias Buxhofer
Wartenberg-Rundfahrt, Matthias Buxhofer
Stage 5 Tour de l'Avenir, Alexandre Usov
Chrono des Herbiers, Jean Nuttli
2001
GP de Genève, Roger Beuchat
Stage 3 & 5 Niedersachsen-Rundfahrt, Alexandre Usov
Stage 4 Niedersachsen-Rundfahrt, Bert Grabsch
Stage 5a Deutschland Tour, Matthias Buxhofer
Tour du Jura, Roger Beuchat
Stage 2 Tour de Wallonie, Bert Grabsch
Stage 4a Tour du Poitou-Charentes, Jean Nuttli
Stage 1 Tour de l'Avenir, Alexandre Usov
 Time Trial Championship, Jean Nuttli
Giro del Mendrisiotto, Alexandre Moos
Chrono des Herbiers, Jean Nuttli
2002
Clásica de Almería, Massimo Strazzer
Stausee Rundfahrt, Massimo Strazzer
Stage 2b Setmana Catalana de Ciclisme, Juan Carlos Domínguez
Stage 5 Setmana Catalana de Ciclisme, Óscar Pereiro
Stage 2, 3a & 4 Circuit de la Sarthe, Massimo Strazzer
Prologue Giro d'Italia, Juan Carlos Domínguez
Stage 6 Tour de Suisse, Alexandre Moos
 Road Race Championship, Alexandre Moos
 Road Race Championship, Alexandre Usov
Overall Sachsen Tour, Oscar Camenzind
Stage 2, Oscar Camenzind
Circuito de Getxo, Martin Elmiger
Stage 1 Vuelta a Burgos, Bert Grabsch
Stage 1 Tour du Poitou-Charentes, Alexandre Usov
Stage 2 Tour de l'Avenir, Alexandre Usov
2003
Trofeo Cala Bona, Alexandre Usov
Stage 2 Circuit de la Sarthe, Massimo Strazzer
Stage 1 Clasica Alcobendas, Alexandre Usov
Stage 3b Tour de Picardie, Juan Carlos Domínguez
Stage 2b Bayern Rundfahrt, Massimo Strazzer
Grand Prix of Aargau Canton, Martin Elmiger
Stage 6 Tour de Suisse, Óscar Pereiro
 Road Race Championship, Daniel Schnider
Stage 3 Sachsen Tour, Oscar Camenzind
2004
Stage 5 Volta a la Comunitat Valenciana, Alexandre Usov
Berner Rundfahrt, Alexandre Usov
Overall Tour de Romandie, Tyler Hamilton
Stage 3 Alexandre Moos
Stage 5 Tyler Hamilton
GP Krka, Uroš Murn
Stage 3 Tour du Languedoc-Roussillon, Martin Elmiger
Classique des Alpes, Óscar Pereiro
Stage 2 Critérium du Dauphiné Libéré, José Enrique Gutiérrez
Stage 6 Tour de Suisse, Niki Aebersold
 Road Race Championship, Grégory Rast
 Road Race Championship, Uroš Murn
Stage 6 Tour of Qinghai Lake, Marco Fertonani
Olympic Games, Time Trial, Tyler Hamilton
Stage 8 Vuelta a España, Tyler Hamilton
Stage 14, 15 & 21 Vuelta a España, Santiago Pérez
Stage 20 Vuelta a España, José Enrique Gutiérrez
2005
Doha GP, Robert Hunter
Stage 5 Tour Méditerranéen, Robert Hunter
Stage 1 Setmana Catalana de Ciclisme, Uroš Murn
Stage 4 Setmana Catalana de Ciclisme, Robert Hunter
Stage 1 Tour de Georgia, Robert Hunter
Stage 3 Tour de Georgia, Floyd Landis
Overall Tour de Romandie, Santiago Botero
Prologue, Óscar Pereiro
Stage 5, Santiago Botero
Stage 1 Volta a Catalunya, Team Time Trial
Grand Prix of Aargau Canton, Alexandre Moos
Stage 3 & 6  Critérium du Dauphiné Libéré, Santiago Botero
 Road Race Championship, Martin Elmiger
Stage 6 Tour of Austria, Fabrizio Guidi
Stage 16 Tour de France, Óscar Pereiro
Rund um die Hainleite, Bert Grabsch
2006
Overall Tour of California, Floyd Landis
Stage 3, Floyd Landis
Overall Paris–Nice, Floyd Landis
Overall Tour de Georgia, Floyd Landis
Stage 3, Floyd Landis
Stage 2 Clasica Alcobendas, Aurélien Clerc
Stage 5 Tour de Suisse, Steve Morabito
 Road Race Championship, Grégory Rast
Stage 7 Tour of Austria, Fabrizio Guidi
Overall Tour de Wallonie, Fabrizio Guidi
Stage 2 & 4, Fabrizio Guidi
Stage 3 Tour de Pologne, Fabrizio Guidi

National champions
2001
 Switzerland Time Trial Championship, Jean Nuttli
2002
 Switzerland Road Race Championship, Alexandre Moos
 Belarus Road Race Championship, Alexandre Usov
2003
 Switzerland Road Race Championship, Daniel Schnider
2004
 Switzerland Road Race Championship, Grégory Rast
 Slovenia Road Race Championship, Uroš Murn
2005
 Switzerland Road Race Championship, Martin Elmiger
2006
 Switzerland Road Race Championship, Grégory Rast

References

External links 

Defunct cycling teams based in Switzerland
Cycling teams based in Switzerland
Cycling teams established in 2000
Cycling teams disestablished in 2006
Former UCI WorldTeams